Salinas is a coastal city located in the Province of Santa Elena, Ecuador. It is the seat of the canton that bears its name. The westernmost city on mainland Ecuador, Salinas is an important tourist center. Salinas, Ecuador's largest coastal resort, offers one of the country's best real estate investment markets and most popular and most upscale beach lifestyle. It was the site of the ISA World Junior Surfing Games Ecuador in 2009. There are two major yacht clubs in Salinas, the first is Salinas Yacht Club, which is smaller than the Puerto Lucia Yacht Club, in Santa Elena, in an area known as 'La Libertad' which, in Spanish means 'The Freedom Town'. Puerto Lucia boasts a hotel, several restaurants, a private beach and apartment buildings, as well as the large marina and port.

It was a small fishing village until June 30, 1929, when it was established as the rural parish of Santa Elena. On December 22, 1937, an official decree was signed by the Commander in Chief, General Alberto Enriquez Gallo and published in Official Gazette No. 52 of December 27 of that year, that elevated the parish to the rank of canton.  Its cantonal head is the town of Salinas, and is composed of the rural parishes Ancon, and Jose Luis Tamayo Anconcito (Muey).

Political division
Salinas is divided into four urban parishes. They are:

Alberto Enriquez Gallo
Carlos Espinoza Larrea
Santa Rosa
Vicente Rocafuerte

Economy and attractions

Salinas Museum 21st Century

The museum is located in Salinas Guayas, Malecon and Quil streets and is known as "The Museum of the Great Peninsula".  It has an archaeological room, a temporary exhibition hall, a lounge, and a naval parade.

The Archaeological room has a complete sample of the cultures that settled in this large peninsula, composed of the Valdivia and Machalilla Engoroy (CV) cultures of the Formative period (4200 BC - 500 BC), as well as the Jambelí Guangala Regional Development period (500 BC - 500) and maintenance-Integration Guancavilca period (500-1530), which include human and animal figurines, ceremonial and utilitarian vessels, bottles, whistle, stone axes, beads necklaces Spondylus, horns and whistles and a variety of both cylindrical and flat seals.

On displays is a model of a raft - Guancavilca Manteña - reproduced according to the description of Samano 1526. The Guancavilcas large rafts were in their black-colored vessels, hands and stone metate for grinding grains, spherical stone weights for nets and pointed to the divers who were also used to hit and release Spondylus shells attached to rocks; copper objects such as axes and hatchets handle coins and Spondylus shell accounts, circular and rectangular shapes that were marketed along with the copper material, in Mexico and Peru, are evidence of the last thousand years of navigation our country.
A model that reproduces the galleon Jesus Maria de la Limpia Concepcion known as "The Captain" takes us back to colonial times and the exhibit showcases the salvage in that galleon wrecked in 1654 off the coast of Chanduy.

Coins of 1, 2, 4 and 8 reales (cobs or crushed calls)? were made in silver and transported on ships to Panama and from there to the Caribbean to be transported to Europe, fragments of silver cutlery and plates and pottery is known as majolica bars, tin, silver, cannonballs both bronze, and iron and lead for muskets.

A gold cross with Latin inscriptions, an earring with pearl bases, burner and silver candelabra, a buckle, metal earrings agate and correspond to the material used for personal use by the passengers on this ship that ran aground off the coast of the town of El Real.

Punta Carnero Beach
People travel from all over the world because the surfing in Ecuador offers an ideal climate all year round. Punta Carnero is a beach located approximately ten minutes south of Salinas. Its name, “Ram Point” in English, stems from the rocky headland located at the southeast end of the beach. Punta Carnero Beach has been chosen many times to be the venue of not just national surf competitions, but also at an international level.

Other attractions
Other attractions of popular activities include:
 The diving on the island of Peel in Ayangue
 Deep-sea fishing
 La Chocolatera, a large cliff that is the most salient point of the Peninsula of Santa Elena where the north and south moving currents collide, giving the waters a rich brown color

 Central Church of Our Lady of Mercy
 Main Salinas Malecon and Chipipe
 San Lorenzo Park Civic
 Paseo Artesanal Los Cedros
 Malecón de Santa Rosa
 Park and Central Church of José Luis Tamayo
 Pacific Mall
 Anconcito Malecon
 Whale Museum
 Whale watching
 Parasailing
 General Ulpiano Paez Airport

Geography

Climate
Salinas has a warm and dry hot arid climate (Köppen BWh). Although the city is located in a tropical zone near the Equator, the weather closely resembles a subtropical climate, being very warm and dry rather than hot, humid, and rainy. This is due to the Humboldt Current, which lower temperatures for most of the year, except in the southern summer months, when the temperature rises.

References

 www.inec.gov.ec
 Taxi Salinas Guayaquil Transportation Salinas Guayaquil.

Specific

Populated places in Santa Elena Province
Beaches of Ecuador
Surfing locations in Ecuador